Tokenzone, Inc. (known colloquially as Tokenzone) is a company primarily known for inventing the concept of Non-fungible Tokens used primarily as digital collectibles on the Internet. Tokenzone was founded on January 21, 2000, by the Arias Brothers (Isaac, Ricardo and Eduardo).

In November 2000, Tokenzone founders filed the first patent application with the United States Patent and Trademark Office for a method and apparatus of collecting and trading items provides for receiving collectible items, trading the items with other collectors and interacting with the items. The items can typically be representative of trading cards including, for example, baseball cards, movie scenes, or in other instances, currencies. Various games can be built around the method including providing that the first player to collect all of the trading cards or Token instances will receive a reward. Multiple players can engage in the game using, for example, the Internet.

 Tokenzone pioneered the concept of Digital Collectibles by developing a technology that centrally managed the creation, distribution and exchange of digital non-fungible tokens. Companies such as The Walt Disney Company, Time Warner, ViacomCBS, Mattel and The Coca-Cola Company were among the earliest adopters.

References

External links 
 Tokenzone Patent Application
 Tokenzone website
 Disney Tokenzone Program website
 Harry Potter Magical Trading Cards website

American companies established in 2000
Companies based in White Plains, New York
Online companies of the United States